Pryganka is a rural locality (a selo) and the administrative center of Prygansky Selsoviet, Krutikhinsky District, Altai Krai, Russia. The population was 903 as of 2013. There are 11 streets.

Geography 
Pryganka is located 28 km west of Krutikha (the district's administrative centre) by road. Podborny and Krasnoryazhsky are the nearest rural localities.

References 

Rural localities in Krutikhinsky District